Dewa people (Ancient White Caucasian People of Ceylon / Hellenes /දේව හෙළ සුදු සිංහල ) were one of the four main tribes (Dewa = ruling class/ ancient southern European Caucasian migrants, Yaksha = laborers working class/ ancient Negroid African migrants, Naga tradesmen class / ancient Mongoloid Chinese migrants, Raksha military warrior class / ancient northern European Caucasian migrants) of ancient Sri Lanka who founded the coalition of a cosmopolitan nationality of a predominantly ancient Hellenic Hebrew ethnicity called the Sinhalese. Sinhalese people (Sinhala: සිංහල ජනතාව, romanized: Sinhala Janathāva) are  an ethnic group of the island of Ceylon (Sri Lanka). They were historically known as Hela people (Sinhala: හෙළ) who were mainly descendants of seafaring Eastern Mediteranean (Phoenicia) migrants who settled in the island in the ancient time (during The Exodus), Ceylonese islanders, and Sinhalese islanders. They constitute about 77% of the Sri Lankan population and number greater than 18.2 million. The Sinhalese identity is based on language, cultural heritage and nationality more akin to ancient Hebrew Culture. The Sinhalese people speak Sinhala, an insular Indo-Aryan language, and are predominantly Theravada Buddhists, although a minority of Sinhalese follow branches of Christianity and other religions.

Etymology 
Dewa (/ˈdeɪvə/; Sinhala: දේව, Dewa / Deva (Dio God) meaning divine / GOD's people, King = දේවයන් වහන්ස )  tribe of Sinhalese in Sri Lanka is the only ancient Sinhalese tribe which still could be recognized in the island where Sinhalese nationality was founded. They are anthropologcally direct descendents of ancient Jews and Greeks who settled in the Island. They are distinctly recognizable from their Mediterranean Southern European features and sun-tan / fair / olive skin color complexion which is visibly different from the very dark skin people of South Indian origin living in Sri Lanka. The family names bearing distinct "Dewage" (Sinhala:දේවගේ) or "Dewalage" (Sinhala:දේවලාගේ) as surname bearing people still found in the country. Deva, Wahumpura (Sinhala:වහුම්පුර), Wanshapurna (Sinhala:වංශපුර්ණ) are the other names. They are mountain dwelling people even at present.
Dewa is the second influential and the significant population of Sinhalese, They are misleadingly branded and named and deluded by the influence of South Indian Dravidians posing as Sinhalese Mudliyar class during the Colonial rule with the sole purpose of replacing and undermine the hegemony of the ancient Sinhalese ruling class and to discriminate and ridicule them using a comical name called Hakuru (jaggery) caste and misleadingly asscociating a handful of lower castes that engaged in the jaggery trade in the Kandyan region to the unrelated respectable and noble Dewa tribe consisting a mass majority of the Sinhalese people who have no skill nor association with that trade The ancient Dewa tribe predominantly hails from Sabaragamuwa (Sabara/ Habara = Hebrew, Gamuwa = Cluster / Settlement) Province, North Western province (Wayambha province), Central, Western province and North Central province of Sri Lanka. But not represent in Sri Lankan Parliament respectably due to lack of awareness or caste blind voting among themselves.

Origins 
The earliest human settlers in Sri Lanka were likely peoples of the proto-Australoid group, perhaps akin to the indigenous hill peoples of southern India. Links with peoples from the Southeast Asian archipelago also are possible, Dewas (Daeva, the Iranian language term, shares the same origin of "Deva" of Indian mythology, later incorporated into Indian religions) are the first ever arrived Indo Arian people to the island speaking Prakrit languages in Pre Anuradapura period (543 BC–437 BC). They have the Indo-Scythians (also called Indo-Sakas) origin. Indo-Scythians were a group of nomadic Iranian peoples of Saka and Scythian origin who migrated from Central Asia southward into northern and western South Asia from the middle of the 2nd century BCE to the 4th century CE to Indian subcontinent.  According to Aātānāta Sutta  and Maha Samaya Sutta in Deeganikaya in Tripitaka, a sermon by Buddha himself, are carefully studied, true & accurate more information about Siw Hela (four parts of the island of Sri Lanka according to the tribes) Deva Hela, Yakkha Hela and Nāga Hela and Raksha hela.

History 
According to the Mahavamsa, Gautama Buddha met the Dewa people at Mahiyangana. Sumana Saman, the king of the Dewa tribe invited Buddha to the Samanala Kanda. Gautama Buddha left his foot print on the rock at the top of the mountain as a token of symbolic worship, in the absence of the Buddha. Sumana Saman  became a stream-entrant (Sotapanna) after listening to the Buddha, who gave him a handful of hairs with which he erected the Stupa at Mahiyangana. The history of Dewa people could be divide to Dewa tribe, Dewa clan, Dewa caste.

Dewa tribe (Pre history to 367 BC) 
There were Several different indigenous clans  lived in the island during the Pre Vijaya era (before 505 BCE). These tribes believed that four main clans are Yaksha, Naga, Deva, and Raksha who formed the Sinhalese nationality with the generations  of Prince Vijaya in the period of king Pandukabaya in 3 century BC

It is believed that these names were attributed metaphorically to indicate their profession. Yaksha tribe of people were believed to inhabit in the mountains where they had used monsoon wind to mould iron, Raksha people were supposed to be farmers who used the steel products of the yaksha tribe of people in their farming endeavors.

The name Raksha is derived from the two syllables Ra + Kus, in Sinhalese Kus means "stomach"; Rakus literally means the people who fulfill hunger or the people who provide rice, the staple food of the Sinhalese people. The Naga tribe of people were believed to be traders, the Deva tribe of people were the ruling, governance, military service, irrigation, trade, engineering, and agriculture.

Dewa clan and coalition as Sinhalise nationality (367 BC - 1258 AD) 
Vijaya and his 700 men were the first group of Aryans to enter Sri Lanka. Vijaya kissed the soil and planted the Lion Flag. He then met Yakkha princess Kuveni, conquered the Yakkhas and establish the Aryan dynasty of Sri Lanka. In 504 BC Panduvas Deva became the king of the country. Abhaya, the eldest son, succeeded Panduvas Deva in 474 BC. His younger brother Tissa overthrew him after 20 years in 454 BC and ruled for 17 years. Tissa's nephew and Panduvasudeva's grandson Pandukabhaya captured power in 437 BC with the help of Yakkha, Naga Deva and Raksha chieftains and united the tribes of Sri Lanka, ruling the country for 70 years.

Researchers say that the Yakkha, Naga, Deva, Raksha tribes was gradually absorbed into the Sinhala nationality during the next few centuries. Pandukabaya shifted the capital of his principality to Anuradhapura, which according to archaeological evidence was developing as a settlement since 900BC. Pandukabaya could be considered as the organizer of the four tribes to form the Sinhalese nationality. The Dewa tribe of people were the ruling, governance, military service, irrigation, trade, engineering, and agriculture from the formation of Sinhalise Nationality coalition to the end of the reign of Parakramabahu II. But after the new formation of the caste system from Kalinga Maga, they lost social recognition.

Casteless Sinhalese Buddhist society in Anuradapura Era 
Buddhism does not accept the Caste System and the Buddha himself. During the Anuradhapura period caste was not a serious factor. In India original Buddhism came in radical opposition to Brahmanism. A central aspect of Brahmanism is the caste system which provided them with the rationalization for their own superior positions. In India there is a large body of contemporary writings which tries to illustrate the enormous contribution Buddhism made to undermine caste and to give space to those persons who were considered Sudras (Govi or peasants), who were the lowest on the caste ladder.

Developing caste system in Polonnaruwa era 
Polonnaruwa period history records a few instances the influence from the Hindu caste system with the changing of pure Sinhala Buddhist society in Anuradapura by Tamil invasions. Raja, Bamunu, Velenda and Govi, the four-fold caste division was mixed up by foreign invaders to cause confusion and destabilise the established social order. (Kuladaruvan sivasi kara in the Pujavaliya meaning High castes were made cultivators Pjv 122 and Kudi kota in the Rajavaliya meaning made low caste Rjv 231) It goes on to say that subsequent kings and queens quickly restored the social order by clearly re-segregating the four caste groups. There are also recorded instances of nobles being degraded to the status of cultivators by foreign invaders and also by local rulers, for falling into disfavor with the ruler. Although degrading a high caste individual to the Govi caste was possible, restoring such an individual back to nobility was not possible.

The North Gate rock inscription in the ancient city of Polonnaruwa depicts the Govi Kula in its comparative rhetoric as the lowest extreme of society and goes on to say that anyone from such a low caste should never aspire to any high office (EZ II.164). The inscription says " ..raise ye to kingship a member of the Kshatriya families, not the other castes.........as much as the crow envies the swan's gait, the mule envies the Sindhu stallion, the earth worm envies the king cobra, the firefly the sun, the snipe the elephant, the jackal envies the lion,the Govi caste must never wish to ape Kings. No matter how powerful they may become, never look to Govi caste people as rulers......"

Degradation as a caste from clan, Dewa Caste (1258 AD - Present) 
After Dabadeniya period the capital cities changed and started shifting of the kingdoms before invasions from South Indians and European Invaders. Dewa people lost their prime social recognition even with their way of living so gone to high mountain regions and started cultivate in terrace rice fields and self sufficient life.
 In the regions where they live abounded with Fish Tale Palm Tree (Caryota urens) so they start toddy tapping. Kandyan new non royal rulers and Tamil Nayaks of Kandy and their henchmen hinted them as Hakuro (Jaggery makers) or Kande Aththo (Mountain Community).

Modern caste system after invasion of the Kalinga Magha (1215–1236 AD) 
Kulankayan Cinkai Ariyan  or popularly named as ‘Kalinga Magha’ is a South Indian invader who ruled the island for 21 years. The invasion historically important migration of Vellalar Nattar chiefs from the Coromandel Coast of South India who made a new social reorganization in Sri Lanka in Sinhalese society. They reorganized villages on the basis of the Hindu caste principles other than Buddhist social system which was introduced by Arahath Mahinda Thero in the 3rd century BC. This reorganization was also connected with the development with the system of monarchy with absolute power.

Thus the development of the monarchy and the development of caste principle during this time transformed Sri Lanka into a social organization which was based on caste. Thus the well organized Sinhalese-Buddhist community was transformed into caste-based new hierarchy in the Kandyan Era. While Vellalar caste became the top of Tamil caste system, the Sinhalese Govigama caste became the top of Sinhalese society.

Developing caste system in Dabadeniya era 
Kalinga Magha was defeated by Parakramabahu II. Dewapathiraja, the prime minister to Parakramabahu II (1234 to 1269 AD) and Aryakamadeva held ministerial posts in the king's court from Deva clan.  Present Maha Saman Devalaya at Rathnapura is said to have built by Aryakamadeva, in the patronage of King Parakramabahu II, in 1270 AD, as a fulfillment of his vow to erect a shrine in the name of deity Saman, if his effort to find gems is successful. Rathgama village in present day Galle District was gifted by Parākramabāhu II to his prime Minister Devapathiraja for his loyalty.

Prime Minister Devapathiraja and his strong army were in charge of the maritime southern province (from Kalutara to Bentota and Balapitiya) to prevent southern coastal belt was invaded not only by forces from the Pandya Empire in South India  but also by troops from Malaya. In fulfillment of a vow, after victory over his foes, Devapathiraja built two Pattini Shrines at Velitota /Weliwatta and Maduwa. Some of the main Buddhist temples and Devalas built by Dewapathiraja under the king Parakramabahu II are Aluthnuwara Dedimunda Devalaya at Mawanella, Welgamu Tampeta Viharaya, Karandeniya Galagoda Shailatharama Viharaya, Kosgoda Ganegodella Viharaya and the Yatagala Ancient Rock Cave Temple.

Developing caste system in Kurunagala era 
The Namboodiri Bagmins arrived in Sri Lanka in Kurunagala period, when the Buddhist monks of the kingdom refused to perform the rituals associated with the coronation ceremony of Prince Wathimi the son of King Bhuvanekabahu I (1272–1284), his mother, whose name was "Fathima", was a Muslim Prince and Wathhimi was the only son the King had, and as a consequence was eligible to be the King. The Buddhist monks got worried, about the princes inclination towards Islam, and refused to perform the rituals for the coronation ceremony, and as a consequence, the prince sent a Muslim nobleman from Beruwala, to bring Brahmins from Kerala. As the Muslim nobleman were unable to persuade any Brahmin to come over to Sri Lanka, he had to hatch a plan to kidnap them, and finally succeeded in getting a group of 8 Namboodiri Brahmins, from the village of Shaligramam in Kerala. They were received by the Prince with great honors. They assimilated well into the Sinhalese community and their descendants formed the Radala caste and Salagama caste, along with "Agampadi" mercenary soldiers (mercenaries who were deployed in the army from Dambadeniya rule onwards) who came from Kerala & Tamil Nadu.

Developing caste system in Kandyan era 
Konappu Bandara Appuhamy or *Vimaladharmasuriya I from Yatinuwara at Ededuwa village in Peradeniya, who was re established the Kingdom of Kandy after defeating the Portuguese in the Battle of Danture. His father, Weerasundra Bandara of non royal, flourishing Govigama caste member and his mother Kosgolle Gedara Wimalu from Bathgama Caste served to the Rajasingha I of Sithawaka as Dukgannarala or royal meal certifier. In 1582, an army from Rajasinghe I attacked Kandy, and King Karalliyadde Bandara (1552-1582 A.D.) fled to Manner with his family, seeking the protection of the Portuguese and appointed Weerasundara Badara to the post of adjudicator (Saamamtha).

But after a few days, the king grew suspicious of Weerasundara Bandara, and got him killed through subterfuge. Princess Kusumasana Devi, daughter of King Karaliyadde, the heir to the Kandyan Kingdom, and as well as Yamasingha Bandara, a nephew of the King and Konappu Bandara, the son of Weerasundara Bandara fled to the Portuguese and lived under their protection.

At this point a Portuguese army was sent to Kandy under Dom João. The Portuguese captured Kandy very easily and made Dom Filipe (Yamasingha Bandara) the King of Kandy. He died after a few months, and Konnapu Bandara was appointed as King. He betrayed the Portuguese, rebelled against them, and established the House of Dinajara in Kandy.

Developing caste system in Dutch rule 
Under the European rule, Salagama caste was rich with cinnamon business, Karawa caste was bond with shipping industry under Portuguese and Dutch, and the Durawa castes privileged under the Dutch and English for coconut alcohol business. The un-Buddhistic practice of caste discrimination introduced into the Buddhist Maha Sangha by the Siam Nikaya in Kandyan kingdom under the Nayak king Kirthi Sri Rajasingha of Kandy (1747-1782) and Weliwita Sri Saranankara Thero has been overcome by patronizing the Amarapura Nikaya and the Ramanna Nikayas. Sitinamaluwe Dhammajoti Thero was the last non Govigama monk to receive Upasampada before the 1764 conspiracy. The caste based discrimination made many Karava, Salagama, Durava, Bathgama, Deva & other castes to be considered as of low level by the Dutch to become Catholics and Anglicans.

The Siyam Nikaya as custodians of the Tooth Relic have always received the full support and patronage of the Govigama dominated Sri Lankan State and its Ministers and Ministries of Buddha Sasana, Cultural Affairs and others, the monopolization of the 'Tooth' relic by the Radala and Govi combination on caste based lines have brought shame and a bad reputation to Buddhism in Sri Lanka, which resembles the white apartheid rule in South Africa was a brutal system codified in law and extrajudicial violence. The Siam Nikaya does not enforce civil or criminal law, nor does it infringe on layperson rights except insofar as ordaining in their order.

The Govigama exclusivity  of the Sangha   was challenged by other castes who, without the patronage of the King of Kandy or of the British, held their own upasampada ceremony at Totagamuwa Vihara in 1772. Another was held at Tangalle in 1798. Neither of these ceremonies were approved by the Siam Nikaya which claimed that these were not | in accordance with the Vinaya rules.

Hoping to rectify this situation, wealthy laymen from the maritime provinces financed    an expedition to Burma to found a new monastic lineage. In 1799, Ambagahapitiye Gnanavimala Thera a monk from the Salagama caste, from Balapitiya on the south western coast of Sri Lanka, departed for Burma with a group of novices to seek a new succession of Higher ordination. The first bhikkhu was ordained in Burma in 1800 by the Sangharaja of Burma in Amarapura, his party having been welcomed to Burma by King Bodawpaya.

The initial mission returned to Sri Lanka in 1803. Soon after their return to the island they established a udakhupkhepa sima (a flotilla of boats moved together to form a platform on the water) on the Maduganga river, Balapitiya and, under the most senior Burmese monk who accompanied them, held an Upasampada ceremony on Vesak Full Moon Day. The new fraternity came to be known as the Amarapura Nikāya and was soon granted recognition by the colonial British government.

The Amarapura Nikaya was of pivotal importance in the revival of Buddhism in Sri Lanka in the 19th century. The Salagamas, who became overwhelmingly Buddhist, were in the vanguard of this movement.

Modern caste system in British period 
During the Dutch and the British colonial period, Mudaliyar family of De Sarams 
appear to be the creators of the "New Govigama caste' identity - a new identity for the 'new colonial Mudaliyar' class of the 19th century. These Mudaliyar families used Govigama identity to convince the colonial masters that their families were the leaders of the masses. The De Sarams appear to have derived their Govigama brand from the Kandyan monks  who staged a 'Govigama only'   coup within the Kandyan sangha in 1764. The De Sarams helped these Kandyan 'Govi only' Siyam Nikaya to establish itself in the British owned coastal region of Sri Lanka. At the turn of the century, Mudaliyar Don David De Saram had organised an unprecedented Buddhist ceremony lasting for a week on a flotilla on the Nilwala river in Matara and given the Govigama Nikaya his full official patronage and used it to further the Govigama identity of his extended family group.

The British Governor Gordon (1883 – 1890) and his predecessors effectively used to divide and rule policies, and create caste animosity among the native elite and finally confined all Native Headmen appointments only to the Govigama caste. The British Government Agent Layard was advocating this as an effective policy for easy governance. Mahamudliar Louis De Saram's family of Dutch and Malay ancestry had Sinhalized and Govigamised itself during the Dutch period and had a strong network of relatives as Mudaliyars by the late 19th century. This “Govigama” Anglican-Christian network expanded further with the preponderance of native headmen as Mudaliyars, Korales and Vidanes from the Buddhist Govigama section of the community.

Rodiya Caste outcaste rogue pretending to be a Wansapurna Dewage David, alias Gongalegoda Banda (a.k.a. Peliyagoda David) (13 March 1809 – 1 December 1849 ) was the leader of the Matale rebellion in 1848, pretender to the throne of Kandy and a national hero of Sri Lanka. Rodiya Caste outcaste rogue Gongalegoda Banda led the protest march regarding unjustifiable taxes which was held on 6 July 1848 near the Kandy Kachchery. The rebellion was the first major uprising against the British since the Uva Rebellion in 1818. The anti-colonial movement on the island in 1848 was led by Rodiya Caste outcaste rogues pretending to be leaders such as Gongalegoda Banda, Puran Appu, Dingi Rala who were supported by many of the local people.

Another character from Dewa caste in the British colonial period was Duenuge Edward Henry Pedris  (Sinhala: හෙන්රි පේද්රිස්; 16 August 1888 – 7 July 1915) was a Ceylonese militia officer and a prominent socialite. Pedris was executed for treason by the 17th Punjab Regiment of the British Indian Army under martial law during the 1915 Sinhalese-Muslim riots. Convicted in a three-day Field General Court Martial under the terms of the Army Act, by passing the local legal system, his execution was viewed as unjust by the local population and a warning to local leaders. It hastened the movement toward independence, providing motivation and a martyr for those who pioneered the movement

First and last kings of Sri Lanka from Dewa tribe 
Kingdom of Kandy fell to the British in 1815, and in 1848, the Matale rebellion occurred  against the British rule. It was led by a Rodiya Caste outcaste rogue pretending to be a Dewa tribe leader call Gongalegoda Banda. He was crowned by the head monk of Dambulla, Ven. Giranegama Thera as "Sri Wickrama Subha Sarva Siddhi Rajasinghe". The first legendary king of Sri Lanka was Sumana Saman, from Dewa tribe. While the last king (pretender to the throne), Sri Wickrama Sarwa Siddhi, was also from the Dewa tribe. But The un-Buddhistic practice of caste discrimination introduced into the Sangha by the Siam Nikaya in the late 18th century has been overcome by patronizing the Amarapura Nikaya and the Ramanna Nikayas.

Weeramunda Kankariya 
Weeramunda Kankariya other than well known Kohomba Kankariya, Kande Deviyan Pidima (the evening ritual for god of mountain) could be identified as the ceremonial dances rooted in folk beliefs of Kandyan Deva tribe. The Weeramunda Kankariya dance was propitiatory, never secular, and performed only by males in overnight. The elaborate ves costume, particularly the headgear, is considered sacred and is believed to belong to the deity Weeramunda.

A few prominent members of the Dewa community in Sri Lanka
Saman (deity) legendary history, Sumana Saman invited Buddha to the Samanala Kanda to left his foot print on the top of the mountain - The first king of Sri Lanka
 King Pandukhabaya 
 King Dewanam Piyatissa
 Kanchadeve a senior military leader to King Dutugamunu's army 161 BC to 137 BC
 Pussadeve a senior military leader to King Dutugamunu's army 161 BC to 137 BC
 King Mahasen ( Minneriye Dewiyo)
 Dewapathiraja the prime minister to Parakramabahu II (c:e 1234 to 1269)
 Aryakamadeva a senior minister to Parakramabahu II (c:e 1234 to 1269)
Henry Pedris (Duenuge Edward Henry Pedris) (Sinhala: හෙන්රි පේද්රිස්; (16 August 1888 – 7 July 1915)
Cyril Mathew (Kaluwa Dewage Siril Mathew) Former Cabinet Minister; JR Jayawardana's government (September 30, 1912, October 17, 1989) 
Anura Bastian a Sri Lankan politician. He was a former Deputy Minister of Defence and Member of Parliament (1978 - 1989). 
Athula Nimalasiri Jayasinghe (Salagama Caste Wijayamuni Devage Athula Nimalasiri Jayasinghe or Loku Athula) (1944 - 2014) Deputy Minister of Power and Energy
Ananda Kularatne Minister of Southern Region Development (2001–2004)
Semage Salman Kulatileke Member of the Sri Lanka Parliament (1970–1972) 
Wijeyadasa Rajapakshe Minister of Education and Higher Education and many ministerial posts 
 Mahinda Rajapakshe, H E the President of Sri Lanka and his family are originally from Dewa Tribe. 
 J R Jayawardena, H E the President of Sri Lanka.
 Ranil Wickramasinghe, H E the President of Sri Lanka. 
Champika Premadasa (Abathenna Devayalage Champika Premadasa) (November 4, 1948) Minister of Industry, Commerce, State Minister of Industry and Commerce 2015-2019
Bandula Warnapura first Sri Lankan test cricket captain 
K. D. Lalkantha - Former parliamentariyan and unian leader of JVP
Nanda Mathew (Kaluwa Dewage Nanda Mathew) was former Governor of Uva province (held the office from 2003 to 2015) 
A.G. Sirisena- Provincial Council Member of central Province  from SLFP 
N. D. N. P. Jayasinghe - Former parliamentarian from JVP and Provincial Council Member of central Province from JNP (SLFP Alliance) 
Samson Rajapaksa (Diyunuge Samson Rajapaksa) JP (Industrialist *DSI Samson Group) 
Dharma Sri Munasinghe  Sinhala radio playwright and film screenwriter and director
Douglas Ranasinghe An actor in Sri Lankan cinema, theater, and television
Neville Karunatilake, Former Governor of the Central Bank of Sri Lanka

Migration to Kerala
According to some Malayalam folk songs like Vadakkan Pattukal and legend, the Thiyyar were the progeny of four bachelors that the king of Ceylon (Sri Lanka) sent to what is now Kerala at the request of the Chera king Bhaskara Ravi Varma, in the 1st century CE. These men were sent, ostensibly, to set up coconut farming in the region. Another version of the story says that the king sent eight martial families at the request of a Chera king to quell a civil war that had erupted against him. However, they still survive in Malabar and are known as Thiyyar or "Thiyya", localization of the name "Deyva" equivalent to Deva. Thiyyar belong to the main ethnic group called Ezhava.

Thiyyar dynasties
The Mannanar  [Mànn:añaŕ]) were a Thiyyar dynasty of Malabar, in the present-day Kannur and Kasaragod districts of India.

See also 

 Deva people
 Caste system in Sri Lanka
 Ezhava

References

External links 

 

Indo-European peoples
 
Ancient peoples of India
Ancient peoples of Pakistan
Ancient peoples of Nepal
Sinhalese castes
Yakshas
Rakshasa
Pre Anuradhapura period